FARRA Design Center is a privately held home products retail store that sells imported furniture and home accessories. The company originated in Beirut, Lebanon, and started as a raw material supplier. The first FARRA store opened in Downtown Beirut in 1976 then moved to Dekwaneh in the early 1980s. In 2004, the company constructed a 7 floors showroom and moved its flagship store to Mkalles (Beirut).

FARRA was founded in 1939 by Anwar Farra in Lebanon named after his family name. It is now privately held by the founder’s family and has since changed its legal name to: Société les fils d’Anwar Farra SAL under Lebanese entrepreneurial laws.

FARRA history 

FARRA Design Center started as a raw material supplier in 1939 for furniture manufacturing and became a furniture importer and distributor in Lebanon.

1910-1960 
The founder, Anwar Farra, was born in 1911. In 1939, he settled in Beirut to effectively run his raw material company. The company specialized in the import of raw material for the wood furnishing and furniture manufacturing industries.

1960-1990 
The company expanded in the successful years of Lebanon, with the continuous development of new hotels and the need for tourist facilities. Around the 1980s, La Société les Fils d’Anwar Farra SARL was created when the company became operated by Anwar Farra closest family members.

1990s-2010s 
From exclusive wholesaler supplier, the stores gave a larger focus on the consumer market to supply furniture directly to residential homes, offices, hotels and restaurants. In 2004, FARRA moved its flagship store to Mkalles Main Road. The new store doubled its capacity with 7 floors of showroom.

The company had a strong impact in its community with charitable donations. It started in 2004 a philanthropic division called Divine Details aimed to help young designers and architecture students become creative through competition, enhance their portfolios and find opportunities for local employment. The company is now one of the most recognizable brands in Lebanon.

FARRA Stores 

The company was launched in 1939 as a raw material supplier. The first FARRA store opened in Downtown Beirut in 1976 then moved to Dekwaneh in the early 1980s. Its store moved to a newly constructed building on Mkalles Main Street in 2004.

Store format 
The store has an architecture that uses glass on its rooftop with white painted side walls. This design has aesthetic and functional advantages. Skylights provide natural lighting that reduces energy costs.

From the side road on the Mkalles (Beirut) highway, the store gives the impression of being a small boutique while it is actually a large retail store with 7 levels of showroom. This visual effect is because the store is built on the edge of a hill.

Interior architects and interior design consultants assist customers while they browse the store. They help customers narrow their choices based on their needs, color and texture preferences, and budget.

Not all furniture is displayed in the store. Particular colors of living rooms may be stocked in the warehouse and is presented on-demand. Sometimes a color and texture sample is presented to the customer to insure they meet their requirements. The FARRA Design Center website contains an overview of its furniture and home accessories collections.

Products 
FARRA furniture, no matter if locally made or imported, is assembled by the company technicians. These technicians are responsible of the home deliveries and furniture assemblies.

Furniture 
FARRA furniture is both locally engineered and designed in its interior design department and imported from international suppliers. With this strategy, FARRA is one of the largest Lebanese furniture importer from North America and Europe (Italy and Spain). Some selected products are manufactured in Lebanon for shorter delivery times and some specialized items are imported from Asia such as outdoor furniture for its teak wood and its choice of home accessories. FARRA imports its more luxurious accessories such as sculptures and crystals from Europe and from specialized suppliers in Lebanon.

International and Middle East design Projects 
FARRA quotes International architectural and interior design projects. Its clients are hotels, restaurants, private villas, apartments, offices and residential compounds.

Hotel and Restaurant Supplier 
FARRA has interior architects which can undergo heavyweight renovation and decoration projects. They coordinate between clients and suppliers to evaluate decoration needs, design mockups, suggest materials, follow up with final execution and deliver the final products.

Projects done

Lebanon Projects 
 Byblos Palace Hotel (Byblos)
 Ramada Downtown Hotel (Downtown, Beirut)
 Markazia Monroe Suites Hotel (Downtown, Beirut)

Qatar Project 
 Spring Compound Villas (Al Gharrafa)

Kuwait project 
 Amaia Residence (Kuwait City)

Iraq project 
 As-Salam Palace, Presidential Peace Palace (Baghdad)

Cyprus project 
 Residential Resort (Limassol)

FARRA Corporate Social Responsibility (CSR)

Charitable giving 
FARRA is involved in several Lebanese charitable causes particularly with:

 Home for the Elderly Sick (Centre Renee Wehbe / Foyer du vieillard malade (Mansourieh, Lebanon) – Hospital for the elderly in incurable condition
 Injaz (Lebanon) division of Junior Achievement Worldwide - Extra-curricular entrepreneurship training to students in both public and private schools
 Trees4Lebanon (Lebanon) – Objective to plant 1 million trees by 2020

Part of its philanthropy program, FARRA provides at the disposition of non-profit associations 1000m2 of its main floor to allow them to organize events and raise money for charity.

Environmental responsibility 
The company selects suppliers with accountable productions, eco-sustainable values (for every tree cut, a new one is planted), and that respects ISO quality environmental standards. The company is one of the sponsors of the Lebanese Rotary project Trees4Lebanon which projects to plant 1 million new trees by 2020.

FARRA events 
FARRA founded in 2004 a non-for-profit philanthropic division called Divine Details which is officially dedicated to promote creativity in interior design and student projects.

Recent Divine Details events 
 Furniture competition (2004)
 Jewelry competition (2005)
 Lebanese Painters Exhibit (2007)
 Lebanese Carpet Exhibit (2009)
 Christmas Tree competition (2009)
 Lebanese Painters Exhibit (2010)
 Christmas Tree competition (2010)
 Divine Details Inter-University Furniture Contest (2011)

References

External links 
 Farra Design Center website

Furniture companies of Lebanon
Retail companies established in 1939
1939 establishments in Lebanon
Buildings and structures in Beirut
Lebanese brands